Azhagar Malai is a 2009 Tamil language masala film written and directed by S. P. Rajkumar. It stars RK and Muktha, while Napoleon, Lal, and Vadivelu play supporting roles. The music was composed by Ilaiyaraaja with cinematography by A. Karthik Raja and editing by J. N. Harsha. The film released on 7 August 2009.

Plot
The film is set in a village near Madurai. Pugazhendi (RK) spends all his time drinking and is ridiculed by everyone. In contrast, his elder brother Pandithurai (Napoleon) is respected and admired by everyone. Pandithurai showers love and affection on Pugazh. He even tries to arrange for his wedding upon hoping he would reform. However, knowing about Pugazh and his habits, nobody comes forward to give their daughter to him. Pugazh, who spends all his time with his maternal uncle Kaththamuthu (Vadivelu), comes across Janani (Muktha). It is love at first sight for him. Meanwhile, the family of Rathnavelu (Lal), another powerful man in the village, is hellbent on revenging Pandithurai and his family due to some previous enmity. They hatch a conspiracy and try to halt Pughazh and Janani's wedding. The film cuts to a flashback, and the reason for the ill-feeling between two families is revealed. It is now up to Pugazh to bump off Rathnavelu and restore peace in his family.

Cast

Soundtrack
Soundtrack was composed by Ilaiyaraaja.

Critical reception
Behindwoods wrote, "There is nothing strikingly novel about the premise of the story. Yet, the director has managed to make something out of it." Sify wrote, "Azhagar Malai has nothing new to offer and has a silly excuse for a plot, with some of the poorest actors you could possibly assemble, aimed at B and C centre audiences." Rediff wrote, "The real problem is the screenplay though the comedy, and some slick production values are the only things that keeps it going while all the twists and turns are as predictable as a 70s pot-boiler."

References

External links
 

2000s masala films
2000s Tamil-language films
2009 action drama films
2009 films
Films directed by S. P. Rajkumar
Films scored by Ilaiyaraaja
Films set in Tamil Nadu
Films shot in Tamil Nadu
Indian action drama films